Irtiza Khalil Farooqui is a Pakistani politician who had been a Member of the Provincial Assembly of Sindh, from May 2013 to May 2018.

Early life and education
He was born on 22 February 1973 in Karachi.

He has a degree of Bachelors of Arts.

Political career

He was elected to the Provincial Assembly of Sindh as a candidate of Mutahida Quami Movement from Constituency PS-119 KARACHI-XXXI in 2013 Pakistani general election. In April 2017, he quit MQM and joined Pak Sarzameen Party.

References

Living people
Sindh MPAs 2013–2018
1973 births
Muttahida Qaumi Movement politicians